Navy Band Kiel is a military band of the German Navy responsible for raising the esprit de corps or morale of personnel of the Navy. The 50 member band has an area of responsibility for the northern German state of Schleswig-Holstein. It also covers the entire coastal region on the at the North Sea and Baltic Sea, with the states of Lower Saxony and  Mecklenburg-Vorpommern as well as the cities of Bremen and Hamburg.

The band has 6 ensembles:

 Concert band
 Egerland band
 Brass quintet
 Saxophone quartet
 Clarinet quartet
 Woodwind Trio

The task of the band is mainly in troop support, all of which includes the ceremonial entry and exit of ships and the swearing-in of sailors. An important part is also public relations with residents of the Kiel area and northern Germany. concerts at home and abroad. As part of the public relations work, the band performs at numerous charity concerts. In recent years, more than 3.2 million euros have been made in donations.

Brief history 

Navy Band Kiel was set up on 1 June 1956 under the designation Navy Band Ostsee (Baltic Sea) in Eckernförde. At the same time, Navy Band North Sea in Wilhelmshaven was established, and was affiliated to the Ostsee Band and was housed in the band's base at Kiel Airport. At first, there was a lack of personnel and instruments, so the ability to continue operated depended solely on cooperation between the two bands. In July 1957, cooperation ended and Navy Band North Sea was able to return to its intended location in Wilhelmshaven. In March 2014, the band in Wilhelmshaven was dissolved and merged with the Baltic Sea Band to become Navy Band Kiel, which became the sole official band of the Navy until 2019, when Navy Band North Sea was reinstated with the new name of Navy Band Wilhelmshaven.

Directors 
 Lieutenant Hermann Schäfer (July 1956 – December 1959)
 Frigate Captain Johannes Schäfer (December 1959 – April 1973)
 Corvette Captain Horst Wenzel (April 1973 – May 1986)
 Frigate Captain Manfred Peter (June 1986 – June 2008)
 Frigate Captain Friedrich Szepansky (July 2008 – February 2022)
 Lieutenant Inga Hilsberg (February 2022 - Present)

References 

German military bands
Military units and formations of the German Navy
Kiel
Musical groups established in 1956
Military units and formations established in 1956
1956 establishments in Germany